VA-174 was an Attack Squadron of the U.S. Navy. It was established as Bomber Squadron VB-82 on 1 April 1944, redesignated as VA-17A on 15 November 1946, and finally as VA-174 on 11 August 1948. The squadron was disestablished on 25 January 1950. Its nickname throughout its life was the Battering Rams. A second, unrelated, squadron was assigned the VA-174 designation in 1966.

Operational history
16 February 1945: VB-82 participated in the first carrierbased air strikes on Tokyo, flying sorties against installations at Mitsune and Mikatagahara Airfields on Hachijō-jima, Nanpo Shoto.
20–22 February 1945: Squadron aircraft provided air support for the invasion of Iwo Jima.
19 March 1945: Japanese naval vessels in the Inland Sea were attacked by VB-82 aircraft and other aircraft assigned to Task Group 58.1.
7 April 1945: Squadron aircraft participated in Task Force 58’s attacks on the Japanese battleship Yamato and her escorts in the East China Sea. The attacks resulted in the sinking of the Yamato, one cruiser and four destroyers.
March–May 1945: The squadron participated in preinvasion strikes on Okinawa and provided air support during the invasion of the island.

Home port assignments
The squadron was assigned to these home ports, effective on the dates shown:
 NAS Wildwood – 01 Apr 1944*
 NAAS Oceana – 15 Jun 1944*
 NAS Norfolk, East Field – 17 Sep 1944*
 NAS Quonset Point – 13 Nov 1944*
 NAS Kahului – 08 Jan 1945*
 NAS Alameda – 09 Jul 1945
 NAS Quonset Point – 01 Feb 1946
 NAAS Cecil Field – 01 Feb 1949
* Temporary shore assignment while the squadron conducted training in preparation for combat deployment.

Aircraft assignment
The squadron first received the following aircraft on the dates shown:
 SB2C-1C Helldiver – 01 Apr 1944
 SB2C-3 Helldiver – 22 May 1944
 SB2C-4E Helldiver – 17 Nov 1944
 SBW-4E Helldiver – Feb 1946
 SB2C-5 Helldiver – 01 Jul 1946
 SBW-5 Helldiver – Jul 1946
 AM-1 Mauler – 01 Mar 1948
 AD-3 Skyraider – Apr 1949

See also
 List of squadrons in the Dictionary of American Naval Aviation Squadrons
 Attack aircraft
 List of inactive United States Navy aircraft squadrons
 History of the United States Navy

References

External links

Attack squadrons of the United States Navy
Wikipedia articles incorporating text from the Dictionary of American Naval Aviation Squadrons